Paramelita flexa is a species of crustacean in family Paramelitidae. It is endemic to South Africa.

References

Gammaridea
Endemic crustaceans of South Africa
Taxonomy articles created by Polbot
Crustaceans described in 1981